Lytoceras fimbriatum is an ammonite species belonging to the family Lytoceratidae. These cephalopods were fast-moving nektonic carnivores. They lived in the Jurassic period.

Description

Distribution
Fossils of species within this genus have been found in the Jurassic rocks of France, Germany, Hungary, Morocco, Portugal, Spain, Tunisia, Turkey, United Kingdom and United States.

References

External links
Ammonites
Geofinder

Jurassic ammonites
Lytoceratidae